The Shree Vajreshwari (or Bajreshwari) Mata Mandir also known as Kangra Devi Mandir is one of the 51 Shakti Pithas dedicated to the goddess Vajreshvari, a form of Goddess Durga located in the town Kangra in the Northern Indian state of Himachal Pradesh.

Location

The Vajreshwari temple is located in the town of Kangra, Kangra district, Himachal Pradesh, India and is 3 km away from both the railway stations of Kangra Mandir and Kangra of Kangra City. Kangra Airport is just 9 kilometers from the temple. The Kangra Fort is situated nearby. Its location on a mountain near Shri Chamunda Devi Mandir is 16 km from Nagarkot (Kangra).

Legends

A legend says that after Goddess Sati sacrificed herself in the honor of Lord Shiva in her father's Yagya. Shiva took her body on his shoulder and started Tandav. In order to stop him from destroying the world Lord Vishnu divided the body of Sati into 51 parts with his Chakra. The left breast of Sati fell at this spot, thus making it a Shakti Peetha.

History
The original temple is said to have been built by the  Pandavas at the time of Mahabharatha. Legend says that one day Pandavas saw Goddess Durga in their dream in which she told them that she is situated in the Nagarkot village and if they want themselves to be secure they should make a temple for her in that area otherwise they will be destroyed. That same night they made a magnificent temple for her in the Nagarkot village. In 1905 the temple was destroyed by a powerful earthquake and was subsequently rebuilt by the government.

Temple structure
The main gate entrance has a Nagarkhana or drum house and is built similar to the Bassein fort entrance. The temple is also surrounded by a stone wall like a fort.

Inside the main area Goddess Vajreshvari is present in the form of Pindi. The temple also have a small temple of Bhairav. In front of the main temple an idol of Dhayanu Bhagat is also present. He had offered his head to the Goddess at the time of Akbar. The present structure has three tombs in it, which is unique in itself.

Temple festivals
Makar Sankranti, which comes in second week of January, is also celebrated in the temple. Legend says that after killing Mahishasura in the battle, Devi had got some injuries. To heel those injuries Goddess had applied butter on her body, in Nagarkot. Thus to mark this day, the Pindi of Goddess is covered with butter and the festival is celebrated for a week in the temple.

Administration
The temple is taken care of by the government of India.

References
 https://web.archive.org/web/20110705070958/http://www.kangrapilgrimage.org/vtemple.html
 https://web.archive.org/web/20110706061601/http://www.kangrapilgrimage.org/devivd.html
 https://web.archive.org/web/20110706061531/http://www.kangrapilgrimage.org/devihow.html

Hindu temples in Himachal Pradesh
Buildings and structures in Kangra district
Durga temples